The Hunter-Blair baronetcy of Dunskey in the County of Wigtown is a title in the Baronetage of Great Britain. It was created for the member of parliament, and Lord Provost of Edinburgh, James Hunter-Blair on 27 June 1786.

Hunter-Blair baronets of Dunskey, Wigtown (1786)
 Sir James Hunter-Blair, 1st Baronet (1741–1787)
 Sir John Hunter-Blair, 2nd Baronet (1772–1800)
 Sir David Hunter-Blair, 3rd Baronet FRSE (1778–1857)
 Sir Edward Hunter-Blair, 4th Baronet (1818–1896)
 Sir David Oswald Hunter-Blair, 5th Baronet (1853–1939)
 Sir Edward Hunter-Blair, 6th Baronet (1858–1945)
 Sir James Hunter-Blair, 7th Baronet (1889–1985)
 Sir Edward Thomas Hunter-Blair, 8th Baronet (15 December 1920 – 21 October 2006)
 Sir Patrick David Hunter Blair, 9th Baronet (born 12 May 1958)

References

External links
 Hunter-Blair, David Oswald. A Medley of Memories, 1919

Baronetcies in the Baronetage of Great Britain
1786 establishments in Great Britain